Almandoz is a village located in the municipality of Baztan, Navarre, in Navarre province, Spain, Spain. As of 2020, it has a population of 184.

Geography 
Almandoz is located 37km north of Pamplona.

References

Populated places in Navarre